The women's 400 metres hurdles event at the 2003 Asian Athletics Championships was held in Manila, Philippines on September 21–23.

Medalists

Results

Heats

Final

References

2003 Asian Athletics Championships
400 metres hurdles at the Asian Athletics Championships
2003 in women's athletics